There are at least 15 named lakes and reservoirs in Clark County, Arkansas.

Lakes
Barton Lake, el.  
Deceiper Lake, el.  
Horn Lake, el.  
Nowlin Pond, el.  
Salt Lake, el.

Reservoirs
 Boswell Lake, el.  
 Country Club Lake, el.  
 De Gray Lake, el.  
 Degray Reregulating Lake, el.  
 Dwiggins Lake, el.  
 Gross Lake, el.  
 Gurdon Pond One, el.  
 Gurdon Pond Two, el.  
 Kirksey Reservoir, el.  
 Lake Barksdale, el.

See also
 List of lakes in Arkansas

Notes

Bodies of water of Clark County, Arkansas
Clark